The teams competing in Group 10 of the 2011 UEFA European Under-21 Championships qualifying competition were Albania, Austria, Azerbaijan, Belarus and Scotland.

Standings

Qualification
Scotland and Belarus secured a qualification to the UEFA Play-offs.
Austria, Albania and Azerbaijan are eliminated.

Matches

Goalscorers
As of 4 September, there have been 64 goals scored over 18 games, for an average of 3.56 goals per game.

1 goal

Own Goals
 Eshgin Guliyev (for Albania)
 Klodian Samina (for Austria)

References
UEFA.com

A
2010–11 in Scottish football
2009–10 in Scottish football